Pseudunela espiritusanta is a species of sea slug, an acochlidian, a shell-less marine gastropod mollusk in the family Pseudunelidae.

Its specific name is a reference to Espiritu Santo Island in Vanuatu, where it was found.

This species, from Espiritu Santo Island in Vanuatu, lives in brackish water. The other two species in the genus Pseudunela are fully marine.

References

Pseudunelidae
Gastropods described in 2009